Cryptocephalus sericeus is a species of beetle of the family Chrysomelidae, subfamily Cryptocephalinae.

Subspecies
Subspecies include:
Cryptocephalus sericeus sericeus (Linnaeus, 1758)
Cryptocephalus sericeus zambanellus (Marseul, 1875) (Bosnia, Croatia, Slovenia, Herzegovina, Italy)
Cryptocephalus sericeus intrusus (Weisw, 1882) (Croatia, Italy, Slovenia)

Distribution
This species can be found in most of Europe, in the eastern Palearctic realm from Siberia east to northwestern China, and in the Near East. It is not present in the British Isles.

Habitat
These beetles inhabit lawns and meadows, especially with yellow flowers of Apiaceae species.

Description
The body of these little beetles is squat, cylindrical and almost oval. Elytra are irregularly punctured, not arranged in longitudinal rows. They do not completely cover the last part of the abdomen. Pronotum and elytra are golden green in males, while females show a metallic bronze color, with green-blue, orange or yellow reflections. The antennas are thread-shaped and relatively long. The head, the legs, and antennae are dark colored.

This species is rather similar to Cryptocephalus aureolus, Cryptocephalus praticola, Cryptocephalus solivagus, Cryptocephalus therondi and Cryptocephalus hypochoeridis.

Biolib
Adults can be found from April to July. The feed on pollen, especially on the yellow flowers of Apiaceae species. Larvae feed on  leaves of the host plants. They live in a housing that consists of their own droppings. The pupation takes place in the soil.

Gallery

References

  Michael Chinery, Insectes de France et d'Europe occidentale, Paris, Flammarion, 2012, 320 p., p. 282-283
 Novak, P., 1964 - I Coleotteri della Dalmazia - Atti Mus. civico Storia Nat., Trieste, 24: 53-113
 Petitpierre, E., 2000 - Fauna Iberica. Vol. 13. Coleoptera Chrysomelidae I. - Museo Nacional de Ciencias Naturales. Consejo Superior de Investigaciones Cientificas, Madrid, 521 pp.

External links
 
 
 Borowiec L.: Culex.biol.uni.wroc.pl Chrysomelidae of Europe

sericeus
Beetles of Europe
Beetles described in 1758
Taxa named by Carl Linnaeus